Williamstown or Williamtown is the name of several places in the world:

Australia
Williamtown, New South Wales
RAAF Base Williamtown, New South Wales
Williamstown, South Australia
Williamstown, Victoria
Williamstown railway line
Williamstown railway station, Melbourne
Williamstown Beach railway station
Williamstown, Western Australia, a suburb of Kalgoorlie
Electoral district of Williamstown, an electoral district in Victoria

Cameroon
Williamstown, Bimbia, a historical village in the kingdom of Bimbia, now no longer in existence

Canada
Williamstown, Ontario
the historical name of Strange, Ontario

Ireland
Williamstown, Ballyloughloe, townland in Ballyloughloe civil parish, barony of Clonlonan, County Westmeath
Williamstown, County Dublin
Williamstown, County Galway, a village 
 Williamstown, County Limerick, a townland 
Williamstown, County Roscommon
Williamstown, Foyran, a townland in Foyran civil parish, barony of Fore, County Westmeath
Williamstown, Mayne, a townland in Mayne civil parish, barony of Fore, County Westmeath
Williamstown, Piercetown, a townland in Piercetown civil parish, barony of Rathconrath, County Westmeath

United Kingdom
Williamstown, Rhondda Cynon Taf, Wales

United States
Williamstown, Indiana
Williamstown, alternative name for Frytown, Iowa
Williamstown, Kansas
Williamstown, Kentucky
Williamstown, Massachusetts, a New England town
Williamstown (CDP), Massachusetts, the main village in the town
Williamstown, New Jersey
Williamstown, New York
Williamstown, Ohio
Williamstown, Pennsylvania
Williamstown, Vermont, a New England town
Williamstown (CDP), Vermont, the main village in the town
Williamstown, West Virginia
Williamstown, Wisconsin 
Williamstown Township, Michigan

See also
Williamston (disambiguation)
Williamson (disambiguation)